Zainal is a given name and surname. Notable people with the name include:

Ahmad Azlan Zainal (born 1986), Malaysian footballer
Mizan Zainal Abidin, the 16th Sultan of the state of Terengganu and 13th King of Malaysia
Sultan Mizan Zainal Abidin Stadium, new multi-use stadium in Kuala Terengganu, Malaysia
Mohd Amirul Hadi Zainal (born 1986), Malaysian footballer
Mohd Zaiza Zainal Abidin (born 1986), Malaysian footballer
Raja Nong Chik Zainal Abidin, the Minister of Federal Territories in the Malaysian Cabinet
Zainal Abidin Ahmad (writer) (1895–1973), Malaysian writer in the 1940s
Zainal Abidin Ahmad (politician), Malaysian politician
Zainal Abidin Hassan (born 1963), former Malaysian footballer, currently a manager
Zainal Abidin III, KCMG, (1866–1918), Sultan of the state of Terengganu from 1881 to 1918
Zainal Ichwan (born 1977), Indonesian footballer
Zainal Rabin (born 1975), Malaysian footballer (goalkeeper)
Zainal Rashid Muadzam III (1857–1881), the 27th Sultan of Kedah (1879–1881)
Zulkarnaen Zainal (born 1973), Singapore football player

See also
Abidin
Zainal Abidin (disambiguation)
Zeynel
Zainul

Arabic masculine given names